Dalik Yarqan (also Romanized as Dalīk Yārqān, Dalīk Yarqān, and Dalīk Yōrqān) is a village in Qeshlaq-e Gharbi Rural District, Aslan Duz District, Parsabad County, Ardabil Province, Iran. At the 2006 census, its population was 263, in 49 families.

References 

Towns and villages in Parsabad County